The Mystery Man is a 1935 American film directed by Ray McCarey.

Plot summary 
A Chicago newspaper man, Larry Doyle, finds himself in St. Louis after a night of drunken revelry. Low on money, he sees a young woman, Anne Olgivie, at a coffee counter.  She hasn't got enough money to cover her bill, so he surreptitiously pays for her. Later, after sending a telegram to his boss asking for funds, Larry sees Anne again, trying to send a wire to her mother for money to come home. Unable to pay for the message, she leaves, and Larry recovers her note. Exiting to the street, he thinks he sees Anne throw herself in front of a car, so he grabs her, making it look as if she embraces him wildly.  He admits to her that he is broke and that he knows she is, as well. They take a suite in a Hotel, pretending to be on their honeymoon and try to raise some money. After being revealed to the hotel manager, Larry receives fifty dollars from his coworkers, which gives them some time. Larry attempts to get a job with a local paper because he has a line on the Eel, a local gangster.  But his boss in Chicago denies his identity.  Again out of money, Larry pawns a police revolver he was given as an award for solving a case in Chicago. Shortly thereafter, Larry and Anne witness a robbery by the Eel, where a police officer is killed. Larry takes the place of the getaway driver and gets the loot before driving off. The next day, Larry describes the robbery to the police, while hiding his involvement. But when the gun used is found, it turns out to be Larry's. Once the police figure out Larry's part in the robbery, he is suspected of murder. When his boss in Chicago finally admits who he is to the police, he is given twenty-four hours to find the Eel.  Returning with Anne to the pawn shop, which they have worked out is the meeting place, Larry confronts the pawn broker, reveals he knows of the broker's complicity and they fight.  Having knocked out the broker, Larry pretends to be him when the Eel arrives. But the Eel isn't fooled and attempts to shoot him, but is shot by Anne, instead. When the story hits the papers, Larry is worried because they all refer to Anne as "Mrs. Doyle", meaning they'll have to get married, which is fine with them both.

Cast 
Robert Armstrong as Larry Doyle
Maxine Doyle as Anne Ogilvie
Henry Kolker as Ellwyn A. "Jo-Jo" Jonas
LeRoy Mason as The Eel, Gangster
James Burke as Managing Editor Marvin
Guy Usher as District Attorney Johnson
James P. Burtis as Whalen
Monte Collins as Dunn, Reporter
Sam Lufkin as Weeks
Otto Fries as Nate, Pawnbroker
Norman Houston as T. Fulton Whistler
Dell Henderson as Mr. Clark, Hotel Manager
Lee Shumway as Plainclothes Man
Sam Flint as Jerome Roberts, Publisher

Soundtrack

External links 

1935 films
American crime films
American mystery films
1930s crime films
1930s romance films
1930s action films
1935 adventure films
1930s English-language films
American black-and-white films
Monogram Pictures films
American action adventure films
Films directed by Ray McCarey
1930s American films